Pitch World was a home shopping television channel broadcast in the United Kingdom and Ireland on the Freesat and Sky platforms.

Pitch World (which was formerly known as Pitch Plus) acted as a sister channel to Pitch TV. The channel operated 24 hours a day and offered items for sale that could be bought by phone or online. The channel shares its shopping website with Pitch TV.

In August 2009, Pitch World temporarily ceased broadcasting after parent company Pitchwell Group went into liquidation. The sales order line of the channel ceased on August 10, with a statement posted on channel's website confirming that the company had gone bust on August 24. In the statement, the firm claimed that the situation was due to "unreasonable steps taken from Lloyds bank which ultimately brought the business to a standstill".

Programming from JML continued to broadcast in its place for a time. On 30 September 2009, Pitch TV and Pitch World returned to Sky under the ownership of Pitch World Limited. Pitch World was removed from Freesat channel 804 on 28 August 2009 before being re-added on 1 October 2009.

On 12 April 2013, Pitch World Limited entered administration and the channel was replaced by Discount TV from TV Discount Store Limited on 1 May. Pitch TV was replaced by Armchair Shop from Tristar Media UK Limited on 22 May 2013.

References

External links
Official site

Television channels in the United Kingdom
Television channels and stations disestablished in 2013
Defunct television channels in the United Kingdom
Companies that have entered administration in the United Kingdom